Escherich is a German surname. Notable people with the surname include:

 Georg Escherich (1870–1941), German politician
 Gustav von Escherich (1849–1935), Austrian mathematician
 Karl Escherich (1871-1951), German entomologist
 Theodor Escherich (1857–1911), German-Austrian pediatrician, discoverer of the bacterium Escherichia coli

German-language surnames